Rose Tata-Muya (born 12 June 1960) is a retired runner from Kenya who specialised mainly in 400m hurdles. She won medals at continental level and competed at the Olympics, World Championships and Commonwealth Games.

Career 

Tata-Muya was only 14 when she participated in her first international championships, the 1974 Commonwealth Games, where she achieved two 8th places: in the 800 metres race and as a part of the Kenyan 4×400 metres relay team. Four years later, she took part again at the Commonwealth Games reaching 800 metres semifinals.

Tata-Muya got two silver medals from the 1979 African Championshionships (400 m hurdles and 800 m). She is also a 400 m hurdles bronze medalist from the 1982 African Championships. In 1980 she took various events at the Commonwealth Games, the best result being 7th place with the Kenyan 4 × 400 m relay team. Her first global event were the inaugural world championships in 1983, where she did not get past 400 metres hurdles heats  She was the only Kenyan woman athlete in Helsinki, and is thus the first Kenyan woman to compete at the world championships.

At the 1987 All-Africa Games in Nairobi, she won silver over 400 m hurdles. The same year she took part at the 1987 world championships, where she reached the 400 metres hurdles semifinals. She competed at the 1988 Summer Olympics, but did not get past 400 metres heats. Two years later she made her last Commonwealth games appearance, finishing 9th in the 400 m hurdles.

After retirement, she has served as a coach for the Kenyan team. She still takes veteran sports, as she competed at the 2007 World Masters Championships in Riccione, Italy. She lives in the UK with her husband Rod Moody, who was the chief attaché of the Kenyan team at the 2002 Commonwealth Games, where she was a coach member. She has been awarded the Order of the Grand Warrior of Kenya and the Order of the Golden Heart of Kenya decorations. She still holds the Kenyan 400 metres hurdles record (as of 2007).

Achievements

References 
 

1960 births
Living people
Kenyan female hurdlers
Kenyan female middle-distance runners
Kenyan female sprinters
Athletes (track and field) at the 1988 Summer Olympics
Athletes (track and field) at the 1974 British Commonwealth Games
Athletes (track and field) at the 1978 Commonwealth Games
Athletes (track and field) at the 1982 Commonwealth Games
Athletes (track and field) at the 1990 Commonwealth Games
Commonwealth Games competitors for Kenya
Olympic athletes of Kenya
Recipients of the Order of the Golden Heart of Kenya
African Games silver medalists for Kenya
African Games medalists in athletics (track and field)
Athletes (track and field) at the 1987 All-Africa Games